The 2001–02 NCAA football bowl games concluded the 2001 NCAA Division I-A football season. The Miami Hurricanes won the BCS National Championship Game over the Nebraska Cornhuskers, 37–14.

A total of 25 team-competitive games were played—starting on December 18, 2001, and ending on January 3, 2002—with participation by 50 bowl-eligible teams. North Texas entered the New Orleans Bowl with a losing record of 5–6; they were able to play in a bowl game by being co-champions of the Sun Belt Conference, having compiled a 5–1 conference record. An additional five all-star games were played, ending with the Hula Bowl on February 2, 2002. One bowl game was established for the 2001–02 season, the New Orleans Bowl. The number of bowl games remained static from the previous season due to the dissolution of the Aloha Bowl after 19 seasons.

Poll rankings
The below table lists top teams (per polls taken after the completion of the regular season and any conference championship games), their win–loss records (prior to bowl games), and the bowls they later played in. The AP column represents rankings per the AP Poll, while the BCS column represents the Bowl Championship Series rankings.

 denotes a BCS bowl game

Non-BCS bowls

All times are in Eastern Time.

BCS bowls

All-star games

Senior Bowl
Game MVP: Antwaan Randle El (Indiana Hoosiers)
Other notable players: David Carr, Ryan Sims, Patrick Ramsey, LeCharles Bentley, Javon Walker
North coach: Mike Holmgren (Seattle Seahawks)
South coach: Dave McGinnis (Arizona Cardinals)
Source:

References